Two Steps from the Middle Ages (1988) is the fifth studio album by power pop band Game Theory.

History 
Miller intended the album to be "a more straightforward, singles-based record" than its predecessor, Lolita Nation: 

In a review of the 2017 reissue, PopMatters wrote that the album "point[ed] forward towards what would, by 1993, become fashionable under the 'alternative' label. One can hear echoes of Game Theory's trailblazing in many of the bands that enjoyed success in the early '90s, including Belly and, especially, Smashing Pumpkins."

After the group was disbanded in 1990, leader Scott Miller went on to form The Loud Family. Game Theory would not release another album until Supercalifragile came out in 2017, four years after Miller's death.

Songs 
The title of the song "Room For One More, Honey," is a reference to an episode of the American television program The Twilight Zone titled Twenty Two.

The album's title has at least a double meaning (referring to both dance steps from the historical period known as the Middle Ages as well as to a person who is "two steps" from middle age) and comes from an alternating rhyme in the fifth track:
Unfolding their defense in stagesHarshest critics can't refuseTwo steps from the middle agesRose details and ruby shoes

In 2012, the song "Rolling with the Moody Girls" was covered by Home Blitz on their EP Frozen Track.

Track listing 
All songs written by Scott Miller.
"Room For One More, Honey" – 3:03
"What the Whole World Wants" – 4:29
"The Picture of Agreeability" – 0:57
"Amelia, Have You Lost" – 3:23
"Rolling with the Moody Girls" – 3:09
"Wyoming" – 3:24
"In a Delorean" – 3:11
"You Drive" – 4:09
"Leilani" – 3:02
"Wish I Could Stand or Have" – 1:59
"Don't Entertain Me Twice" – 3:59
"Throwing the Election" - 4:16
"Initiations Week" - 2:29

Personnel 
 Guillaume Gassuan - bass and backing vocals
 Gil Ray - drums, backing vocals and guitar
 Donnette Thayer - guitar and vocals
 Shelley LaFreniere - Synthesizers and backing vocals
 Scott Miller - vocals and guitar

References

External links 
 
 
 

1988 albums
Game Theory (band) albums
Albums produced by Mitch Easter
Enigma Records albums